Bonwell House is a historic home located near Frederica, Kent County, Delaware.  It dates to the mid-18th century, and is a two-story plus attic, four bay, brick dwelling.  It has a lower west wing. Bonwell House was the nucleus of a group of mills called the Leamington Mills.

It was listed on the National Register of Historic Places in 1973.

References

Houses on the National Register of Historic Places in Delaware
Houses completed in 1747
Houses in Kent County, Delaware
National Register of Historic Places in Kent County, Delaware